Invoicera is an online invoicing software. The software was created by a company with the same name that was founded in 2006, had 125 employees, and is based in India.

It allows users to monitor, dispatch, and accept invoices in one web service. After signing up for the service, users are assigned a personal subdomain to set up their invoice configuration. It allows users to add clients' data to the service through uploading a Microsoft Excel file.

Invoicera is compatible with businesses of varying sizes, including freelancers, small businesses, and large businesses. It is compatible with Basecamp, a project-management tool, so Invoicera can upload data from Basecamp. The software interfaces with more than 25 payment gateways. It supports subscriptions and repeated invoices and allows clients to schedule late fees when payments have not been made on time. Invoicera uses freemium model, letting users dispatch an unrestricted number of invoices to at most three customers.

Chelsea Krause wrote in a 2019 review for Merchant Maverick, "Unfortunately, the software isn't as developed as it could be. Time tracking and reporting are limited and there are no live bank feeds — which is surprising for a company so focused on automation (especially since even many of the worst invoicing options out there still offer live bank feeds)." She further criticized Invoicera for having bad customer service and the software for not having recent changes.

Brian Turner wrote in TechRadar that Invoicera had fewer templates compared to the other services he reviewed but "the ones offered are fully customizable". Rob Clymo wrote in TechRadar that "Invoicera lets you automate your invoicing and billing needs without too much in the way of hassle" and that although it "isn't a complete accounts solution ... it's a powerful supplement".

References

External links
 

Web applications